Gareth James Chilcott (born 20 November 1956 in Bristol) is a former rugby union player, who played at prop for Bath and England.

He made his England debut against Australia in 1984. He toured with the British Lions in Australia in 1989, together with Andy Robinson and Jeremy Guscott.

He acted in the revived stage play Up 'n' Under which was set around a rugby league sevens tournament.

Chilcott is also a Bristol City supporter and goes to many home and away games.

He appeared in a rugby special of Come Dine with Me with Martin Offiah, Victor Ubogu, and Kyran Bracken which was shown in September 2011.

In 2012, Chilcott established Venatour, a sports travel company based in Cheltenham. He also hosts a regular online opinion show, Cooch's Corner, featuring opinion and rugby guests.

Charitable work
He is an active Honorary President of the rugby charity Wooden Spoon in Somerset, improving the lives of disadvantaged children and young people in Britain and Ireland.

He is also an ambassador for SOS International Rugby Board Kit Aid. SOS/IRB Kit Aid is a "green" rugby project that gives less-advantaged children around the world a chance to play and develop rugby in emerging nations through the collection and distribution of unused/unwanted recycled rugby kit from the UK and Ireland.

References

External links
SOS IRB Kit Aid
Profile at Bath Rugby "Hall of Fame"

1956 births
Living people
Bath Rugby players
British & Irish Lions rugby union players from England
England international rugby union players
English rugby union players
Rugby union players from Bristol
Rugby union props